Rawda, Rawḍah, or ar-Rawḍah, meaning garden or meadow, may refer to:


Bahrain
 Al Rawda Palace, a palace in western Bahrain

Egypt
 Rawda Island, an island on the Nile in Cairo
 Al-Rawda, North Sinai

Saudi Arabia
Rawdah, Medina, an area of the Al-Masjid an-Nabawi mosque in Medina

Syria
 Al-Rawda, Hama, a village near Hama
 Al-Rawda, Tartus, a town in the Tartus Governorate
 Al-Rawda (tell), a Bronze Age archaeological site near Hama
 Rawda, Idlib, a village in Jisr al-Shughur District, Idlib
 Rawda Square in Damascus

Yemen
 Al-Rawda, Yemen, a village in  Al Bayda District in the Al Bayda Governorate